Bisotun District is a district (bakhsh) in Harsin County, Kermanshah Province, Iran. At the 2006 census, its population was 24,793, in 5,758 families.  The district has one city: Bisotun. The District has two rural districts (dehestan): Chamchamal Rural District and Shirez Rural District.

References 

Harsin County
Districts of Kermanshah Province